Abraham the Writer is a saint of the Syriac Orthodox Church. His feast day is 30 December.

References

Sources
Holweck, F. G. A Biographical Dictionary of the Saints. St. Louis, MO: B. Herder Book Co. 1924.

Year of birth missing
Year of death missing
Syriac Orthodox Church saints